Longtan Lake Park, is a recreational urban park located in Dongcheng District (formerly in Chongwen District) of Beijing, just east of the Temple of Heaven. It is one of the largest modern parks inside the 2nd Ring Road of Beijing. There is also a large outdoor bird market in the park.
Located at the center of the park is a large lake called which features many moon bridges, rock gardens, dragon boats, tea houses and restaurants.
'

The major landscape in this park is the Longtan Lake, which translates as Dragon Pool. The lake used to be a huge man-made cave on the ground. The cave was created during Jiajing Emperor's reign of Ming Dynasty, when people in Beijing dug earth and mud there to make bricks for the city wall of Beijing Outer City. After that, the cave became the drainage area of the old Beijing, and became a lake of waste water.

In 1952, the Beijing government decided to solve the environmental problem caused by the lake of waste water. They drew away waste water from the lake, and invited Liang Sicheng, a famous architect and landscape designer, to re-design this area to be a public park. The waste water was removed and replaced with freshwater to create a, new, scenic lake. Some other attractions are also located in the park, such as a temple dedicated to Yuan Chonghuan, a collection of tablets, a series of hills, a waterfall and the "Gardens of Chinese Dragons".

References

External links
Longtan Park: Beijing Visitor

Parks in Beijing
Dongcheng District, Beijing